Christopher William Timm (born 17 November 1968) is an English former first-class cricketer.

Timm was born at Didsbury in November 1968. He later studied at University College, Oxford where he played first-class cricket for Oxford University in 1989, making two appearances against Northamptonshire and Middlesex at Oxford. Playing as a wicket-keeper, he scored 10 runs in his two matches and made a single stumping.

References

External links

1968 births
Living people
People from Didsbury
People educated at Tonbridge School
Alumni of Worcester College, Oxford
English cricketers
Oxford University cricketers